Whitewater Township, Missouri may refer to the following townships:

 Whitewater Township, Bollinger County, Missouri
 Whitewater Township, Cape Girardeau County, Missouri

See also
Whitewater Township (disambiguation)

Missouri township disambiguation pages